Hispania Líneas Aéreas was a Spanish charter airline.

Company history
Hispania was founded in 1982 as an on-demand charter operator and began operations using two SE 210 Caravelle aircraft on charter flights to the Spanish resorts from Great Britain, Germany, France and other countries. In 1985 three Boeing 737-200 were added and those eventually replaced all the Caravelles.  As business increased, Hispania acquired a new fleet consisting of Boeing 737-300 and Boeing 757-200, however, the aircraft lease payments were too expensive for the carrier to sustain and in 1988 it was nearly acquired by Air Europa. After the attempted takeover and other cash-investment schemes failed, Hispania ceased operations in July 1989.

Fleet details

3 - SE 210 Caravelle
3 - Boeing 737-200
8 - Boeing 737-300
2 - Boeing 757-23A(ER)
2 - Douglas DC-8-61 (leased from Nationair Canada)

See also
List of defunct airlines of Spain

References

External links

Code and fleet information

Defunct airlines of Spain
Airlines established in 1982
Airlines disestablished in 1989
1989 disestablishments in Spain
Spanish companies established in 1982